Zdzisław Stolarski (born 11 June 1948 in Grzegorzewice) is a Polish former wrestler who competed in the 1972 Summer Olympics.

References

External links
 

1948 births
Living people
Olympic wrestlers of Poland
Wrestlers at the 1972 Summer Olympics
Polish male sport wrestlers
People from Grójec County
Sportspeople from Masovian Voivodeship